The Gibson House, also known as The Mark Twain Manor, is an historic home which is located in Jamestown, Mercer County, Pennsylvania. 

It was added to the National Register of Historic Places in 1978.

History and architectural features
Built in 1855, the Gibson House is a two-story, square brick residence with a hipped roof and central cupola. The design displays elements of the Greek Revival, Italianate, and Georgian styles. Also located on the property is a contributing carriage house. 

The house was converted to restaurant use during the mid-1950s, and is now owned by a community foundation.

It was added to the National Register of Historic Places in 1978.

References

External links
The Gibson House (aka: The Mark Twain Manor) - Victorian Houses on Waymarking.com

Houses on the National Register of Historic Places in Pennsylvania
Georgian architecture in Pennsylvania
Greek Revival houses in Pennsylvania
Italianate architecture in Pennsylvania
Houses completed in 1855
Houses in Mercer County, Pennsylvania
National Register of Historic Places in Mercer County, Pennsylvania